Brown Submarine is the first album by the Boston Spaceships, released in 2008.

Track listing
All songs written by Robert Pollard.

Side A
Winston's Atomic Bird – 1.48
Brown Submarine – 1.22
You Satisfy Me – 3.04
Ate It Twice – 1.56
Two Girl Area – 2.31
North 11 A.M, – 2.35
Zero Fix – 2.44

Side B 
Psych Threat – 3.39
Andy Playboy – 1.30
Rat Trap – 2.22
Soggy Beavers – 1.34
Ready To Pop – 2.33
Still In Rome – 2.57
Go For The Exit – 2.23

Personnel
Robert Pollard – vocals
John Moen – drums
Chris Slusarenko – guitar, bass, keyboards
Brian Berg – percussion
David Grant- trumpet on tracks B1 and B5

References

2008 albums
Boston Spaceships albums